Piopio College is a coeducational secondary school in Piopio, a town in the Waitomo District of New Zealand.

History
The College opened in 1975 when Piopio District High School was separated into Piopio Primary School and Piopio College. It won the Goodman Fielder Best School of the Year Award in 1999 jointly with Patearoa School.

Piopio District High School was formed in 1924. It was the first school in New Zealand to have a school bus service.

A combined schools centenary was held in March 2009.

Notable alumni
David Fagan – world class shearer
Jenny-May Coffin – former Silver Ferns netball player, for which she was the vice-captain in 2001; TVNZ presenter
Hannah Osborne – Olympic rower
Farah Palmer – former captain of the Black Ferns
Rob Waddell – world and Olympic champion rower; grinder for Team New Zealand in the Americas Cup

Principals

Bob Ford (1975–1979)
Brian Tegg (1980–2001)
Tim Davies-Colley (2002–2007)
David Day (2008–2012)
Julie Radice (2013–2015)
Johan van Deventer (2017–2021)
Rakesh Govind (2022-present)

References

Secondary schools in Waikato
Waitomo District
1975 establishments in New Zealand
Educational institutions established in 1975